Western Heritage Furniture is an American manufacturer of custom furniture, founded by master craftsman Tim McClellan in 1991.  The company is best known for its one-of-a-kind furniture pieces made from reclaimed lumber obtained from old buildings and barns. Its pieces have been featured in several books and magazines, including the 2009 coffee table book Contemporary Western Design by Thea Marx.

McClellan founded Western Heritage Furniture in Seattle in 1991. He began by making furniture from wood that he reclaimed from slash-and-burn piles. After founding the company, McClellan made a bet with his girlfriend that he could build a lodgepole bed that she wanted for less than the $1,200 retail price. The bed that he completed turned into requests for more beds which led to him being commissioned to furnish entire homes out of reclaimed wood. McClellan relocated the company to Jerome, Arizona in 1995, occupying gymnasium of the old Mingus Union High School building.

Western Heritage Furniture is known for its green use of materials to build its sustainable products. The company also delivers its furniture in vehicles powered by biodiesel, manufactured by the company's subsidiary Verde Biofuel. In addition to selling furniture through its website, Western Heritage Furniture operates a storefront in Jerome, Arizona. It also sells through partner dealers in various locations throughout the United States.

See also
 Black Hills (Yavapai County)
 Sustainable living

References

External links
 Western Heritage Furniture official website

Furniture companies of the United States
American companies established in 1991
Manufacturing companies based in Arizona